Territorial Assembly elections were held in the Republic of Upper Volta on 19 April 1959. The result was a victory for the African Democratic Rally, which won 62 of the 75 seats in the Assembly. Voter turnout was 46.9%.

Results

References

Elections in Burkina Faso
Upper Volta
1959 in Upper Volta